Petr Horálek (born July 21, 1986) is a Czech astrophotographer, popularizer of astronomy and an artist.

Astronomy and Astrophotography

Early life 
He worked as a volunteer of the Pardubice observatory in 1999–2010 and studied Theoretical physics and Astrophysics at the Masaryk University in Brno (2007–2011). During this period, in 2011, he started with astrophotography

Astrophotography 
Petr specializes in photographing "rare night-sky phenomena" and TWAN style photographs with the night sky over known foreground. His images capture unique moments and views in the sky to show the importance of the fight against the global light pollution problem.

Unique image from Aitutaki Island 
However, those distant places were over his financial capacities due to medium GDP of his native country so in 2014, he bought Working holiday visa and travelled to New Zealand. Working on fruit orchards for 4 months, he was able to earn enough money for his only goal: to travel to the Cook Islands and to capture (probably) historically the first nightscape photograph with the Milky Way over the popular Aitutaki Island.

ESO Photo Ambassador 
In January 2015, Petr Horálek became the 22nd Photo Ambassador of the European Southern Observatory. He focuses mostly on Ultra-hd fulldome and panoramatic images of the night sky over ESO observatories, which can be freely used in digital planetariums. With this work, he participates on the program of ESO Supernova Planetarium & Visitor Centre.

Scientific impact 
Several of his images had scientific impact. Here are some examples:
 Record of a unique bright Perseid fireball on August 12, 2012, analyzed by P. Spurný at al. and published in Astronomy & Astrophysics magazine
 Data of the hybrid solar eclipse of 2013 in Uganda were post-processed by a mathematician and a computer-scientist, prof. Miloslav Druckmüller
 Sophisticated imaging and post-processing of the zodiacal light over the ESO La Silla Observatory in April 2016 revealed structures in the zodiacal band, image was published in the ESO Messenger 164 (June 2016) as well as the ESO Picture of the Week

Awards 
Images of Petr Horálek were chosen several times as NASA's Astronomy Picture of the Day, ESO Picture of the Week and Czech Astrophotography of the Month. In October 2015 the International Astronomical Union named the asteroid (6822) 1986 UO after him (see Asteroid 6822 Horálek).

Asteroid 6822 Horálek 
Asteroid 6822 Horálek or (6822) 1986 UO was discovered by Zdeňka Vavrová on October 28, 1986, at Kleť Observatory, the Czech Republic. It is about 5 km wide asteroid orbiting the Sun in the Main asteroid belt with perihelion at 1.943 AU and aphelion 3.235 AU from the Sun

MPC Citation for 6822 Horálek 
Petr Horálek (b. 1986) is a Czech astronomer, astronomy popularizer, passionate photographer, and one of the ESO Photo Ambassadors. He travels the globe to observe solar and lunar eclipses. His breathtaking photographs capture the beauty of the night sky and its harmony with the landscape. [Ref: Minor Planet Circ. 95803]

Art 
Petr Horálek is also an artist. He focuses on sketches, especially female portraits and emotional sketches

References

External links 

 Petr Horálek's images in ESO archive
 Petr Horálek's official website

Space photography and videography
1986 births
Czech photographers
Living people